Cursive script may refer to:

 Cursive, handwriting styles
 Roman cursive, a style of Latin calligraphy
 Cursive Hebrew, a style of Hebrew calligraphy
 Cursive script (East Asia), a style of Chinese calligraphy